Olinda Cho Yu Yen (born 24 May 1980) is a Singaporean singer, actress and entrepreneur.

Professional background
Cho emerged as the second runner-up of the first season of Singapore Idol in 2004, behind Sylvester Sim and Taufik Batisah.

Cho released her debut album, Rewind, in October 2007. She also rearranged songs including the Singapore national anthem, Majulah Singapura, which was broadcast for Starhub's national day commercial, Majulah Moms.

In September 2013, Cho started a modelling agency, NU Models, with Sheila Sim.

In 2016, Cho participated in the Singaporean audition for the first season of Sing! China, then tentatively known as China Super Vocal, and emerged as the winner for Singapore.

Cho was approached directly by Sing! China to participate in the second season in 2017. She sang 不能说的秘密 during the blind audition and won Na Ying, Liu Huan and Jay Chou's votes.  She chose to be part of Jay Chou's team. She was one of the top 4 contestants in Jay Chou's team.

Due to the COVID-19 pandemic, Cho switched to selling premium fruits.

Discography

TV Series
 Shooting Stars (2005)

Albums
Rewind (2007)

References

External links
 

1980 births
Living people
Singaporean people of Chinese descent
21st-century Singaporean women singers